Brian Island is the westernmost of the Debenham Islands, off the west coast of Graham Land. Brian Island was charted by the British Graham Land Expedition (BGLE) under John Riddoch Rymill, in 1936. Brian Island was named by John Riddoch Rymill for Brian Debenham (1920–43), the second son of Frank Debenham, member of the British Graham Land Expedition Advisory Committee (BGLE Advisory Committee).

See also 
 List of Antarctic and sub-Antarctic islands

References

 

Islands of Graham Land
Fallières Coast